Stygobromus bifurcatus, the bifurcated cave amphipod, is a troglomorphic species of amphipod in family Crangonyctidae. It is endemic to Texas in the United States.

References

Freshwater crustaceans of North America
Crustaceans described in 1967
Cave crustaceans
Endemic fauna of Texas
bifurcatus